Glynco is an area in Glynn County, Georgia located on the northwestern edge of Brunswick, Georgia. Glynco is a portmanteau of the words "Glynn County".

History
In 1942 the Naval Air Station Glynco was established on the area now known as Glynco. FLETC has its own United States Postal Service ZIP code, 31524. The US Census lists Glynn County, Georgia as having 85,219 residents.

References

Geography of Glynn County, Georgia